Sead Muratović (born 6 February 1979) is a retired Serbian footballer. He is currently the manager of youth teams of FK Novi Pazar.

Born in Novi Pazar, Muratović played with FK Mogren before joining FK Spartak Subotica where he played between 1998 and 2000 in the First League of FR Yugoslavia. In 2000, he moved to Singapore and signed with Tampines Rovers in the S. League. He played with Tampines in the 2007 AFC Cup.

He was headbutted by Michael Owen during an UEFA European Under-19 Championship match against England in 1997, resulting in the first red card of Owen's fledgling career.

Muratović retired from football in 2009 and begin his coaching career.

References

External links
 Profile at Srbijafudbal

1979 births
Living people
Sportspeople from Novi Pazar
Bosniaks of Serbia
Serbian footballers
FK Novi Pazar players
FK Mogren players
FK Spartak Subotica players
Tampines Rovers FC players
Association football defenders
Serbian football managers
Expatriate footballers in the Maldives
Club Valencia players
Serbian expatriate sportspeople in Singapore
Serbian expatriate sportspeople in the Maldives
Expatriate footballers in Singapore
Singapore Premier League players